Gilsdorf is a small town in the commune of Bettendorf, in north-eastern Luxembourg.  , the town has a population of 864.

It is the town in which Prince Louis of Luxembourg married. While it was an unusual choice of venue for the wedding of a Prince of the ruling Grand Ducal family, it is supposed that its relative isolation from the City of Luxembourg proved to be a favourable factor. While the approach to media and publicity matters by the Grand Ducal family since the accession of Henri of Luxembourg in 2000 has varied markedly, it has been assumed that the presumed desire of the Grand Ducal family to avoid publicity, as far as possible, was a significant reason for the choice of Gilsdorf for the wedding.

Bettendorf, Luxembourg
Towns in Luxembourg